The Men's 73 kg event at the 2010 South American Games was held on March 20.

Medalists

Results

Main Bracket

Repechage

References
Report

M73
South American Games 2010